"Our God Reigns" is a song by the Christian contemporary-alternative rock musician Brandon Heath from his first studio album, Don't Get Comfortable. It was digitally released in 2006, as the first single from the album. This song was produced by Dan Muckala.

Charts

Weekly charts

References 

2006 debut singles
Brandon Heath songs
Songs written by Brandon Heath
Song recordings produced by Dan Muckala
2006 songs